The following are the national records in Olympic weightlifting in Sweden. Records are maintained in each weight class for the snatch lift, clean and jerk lift, and the total for both lifts by the Swedish Weightlifting Federation (Svenska Tyngdlyftningsförbundet).

Current records

Men

Women

Historical records

Men (1998–2018)

Women (1998–2018)

References
General
Swedish records – Men 19 June 2022 updated
Swedish records – Women 23 October 2021 updated
Specific

External links
Swedish Weightlifting Federation web site

Records
Sweden
Olympic weightlifting
weightlifting